Minister Mentor was a position in the Cabinet of Singapore created in 2004 as part of a transition in political leadership. The only person to hold the post, between 2004 and 2011, was Lee Kuan Yew.

Background
On 12 August 2004, when Lee Hsien Loong succeeded Goh Chok Tong as the prime minister of Singapore, he announced the position of Minister Mentor, as part of a transition of political leadership, when naming his Cabinet. 

Prior to Lee Kuan Yew's appointment as Minister Mentor, he was Senior Minister between 1990 and 2004, under Goh Chok Tong's Cabinet. Goh was subsequently appointed Senior Minister under Lee Hsien Loong's Cabinet, when he stepped down as prime minister.

On 14 May 2011, following the general election that took place seven days earlier, Lee Kuan Yew and Goh Chok Tong announced their retirement from the Cabinet, but continued to serve as Members of Parliament (MPs) on the backbenches until Lee's death in 2015 and Goh's retirement from politics in 2020 respectively.

References

External links 
 An analysis of Lee Kuan Yew's role as Singapore's Minister Mentor

Government ministers of Singapore
2004 establishments in Singapore
2011 disestablishments in Singapore